XHTOM-FM is a radio station in Toluca, State of Mexico, Mexico. Broadcasting on 102.1 FM, XHTOM is operated by Grupo Siete Comunicación and carries the Radio Disney format.

History
XHTOM received its concession on April 1, 1992. It was originally owned by Radiorama subsidiary Radio Celebridad, S.A. However, Grupo Siete operates the station. From 1996 to 1999, the station was known as "Cañón 102.1", playing Regional Mexican music, before flipping to a pop format known as Stereo 102.1. In 2005, the station shifted toward an alternative direction under the name Neurotica FM. XHTOM-FM was a franchise of Los 40 Principales from 2009 to 2013, but it remained in the pop format after under the names +FM (Más Radio) and Neurótik.

On April 7, 2021, the station became Grupo Siete's second station in the Radio Disney franchise after XHFO-FM in Mexico City.

References

Radio stations in the State of Mexico
Radio stations established in 1992
1992 establishments in Mexico